La Intrusa may refer to:

La Intrusa (1939 film), a 1939 Argentine film
La intrusa (1954 film), a 1954 Mexican film
La intrusa (1964 TV series), a 1964 Mexican telenovela series
La intrusa (1986 TV series), a 1986 Venezuelan telenovela series
La intrusa (2001 TV series), a 2001 Mexican telenovela series
La Intrusa, 1966 short story by Jorge Luis Borges

See also
A Intrusa, a 1979 film adaptation of the 1966 short story La Intrusa